The fourth competition weekend of the 2015–16 ISU Speed Skating World Cup was held in the Thialf arena in Heerenveen, Netherlands, from Friday, 11 December, until Sunday, 13 December 2015.

There were no world records over the weekend. Multiple winners were Pavel Kulizhnikov of Russia, who won one of the men's 500 m races and the 1000 m race, and Sven Kramer of the Netherlands, who won the men's 5000 m race and the team pursuit.

Schedule
The detailed schedule of events:

All times are CET (UTC+1).

Medal summary

Men's events

 In mass start, race points are accumulated during the race. The skater with most race points is the winner.

Women's events

 In mass start, race points are accumulated during the race. The skater with most race points is the winner.

Standings
The top ten standings in the contested cups after the weekend. The top five nations in the team pursuit and team sprint cups.

Men's cups
500 m

1000 m

1500 m

5k/10k

Mass start

Team pursuit

Team sprint

Grand World Cup

Women's cups
500 m

1000 m

1500 m

3k/5k

Mass start

Team pursuit

Team sprint

Grand World Cup

References

 
4
Isu World Cup, 2015-16, 4
ISU Speed Skating World Cup, 2015-16, World Cup 4